Sidney Dorsey (born February 23, 1940, in Atlanta, Georgia) is an American former law enforcement officer who served as sheriff of DeKalb County, Georgia from 1996 to 2000. Dorsey was the first African American to serve as sheriff of DeKalb County. When he was defeated in a 2000 runoff election by challenger Derwin Brown, he arranged the murder of Brown.

Derwin Brown murder case

On the evening of December 15, 2000, police captain Derwin Brown, who had defeated Dorsey that November in the election for county sheriff, was murdered at his home in Decatur, Georgia. On July 10, 2002, Dorsey was convicted of ordering Brown's assassination in order to obstruct Brown's expected probe into corruption occurring in the DeKalb County sheriff's office during Dorsey's term. 

Superior Court Judge Cynthia Becker sentenced Dorsey to life on the murder conviction, an additional 23 years on racketeering and violation of oath of office convictions, and concurrent sentences ranging from 10 to 15 years on his several convictions of theft by taking of the oath of office of an elected official. Dorsey is currently held in Georgia State Prison.

In 2007, it was reported that Dorsey allegedly confessed to his part in ordering the hit on Brown, out of bitterness for his defeat in the local county sheriff's election. He claimed he had attempted to abort the assassination plot before Brown's murder, but was unsuccessful.

Atlanta Child Murders Task Force
Before his tenure as sheriff, Dorsey served on the task force that looked into reopening the case of convicted murderer Wayne Williams. Dorsey appeared as one of many, including some of the victims' relatives, who voiced public doubt of Williams's guilt of the murders. Dorsey is quoted as stating: "Most people who are aware of the child murders believe as I do that Wayne Williams did not commit these crimes". Williams was identified as the key suspect in the Atlanta Child Murders that occurred between 1979 and 1981. In January 1982, he was found guilty of the murder of two adult men. Dorsey, as an Atlanta homicide detective, supervised the first search of Williams' home in 1981.

References

1940 births
Living people
African-American police officers
American police officers
Georgia (U.S. state) sheriffs
American police officers convicted of murder
American prisoners sentenced to life imprisonment
People convicted of murder by Georgia (U.S. state)
Prisoners sentenced to life imprisonment by Georgia (U.S. state)
People from Atlanta
American assassins
African-American sheriffs
21st-century African-American people
20th-century African-American people